Kuala Pahang is a town ward and mukim in Pekan District, Pahang, Malaysia.

Geography
Kuala Pahang means Lower Pahang or "the estuary of the Pahang River"; this is where the Pahang River empties into the South China Sea.

Attractions
The Pahang Old Royal Mausoleum is located at Kampung Marhum.

Tourist attractions
 Pahang Old Royal Mausoleum

References

Pekan District
Mukims of Pahang
Towns in Pahang